Alvin Maccornell (born 13 January 1993) is a Liberian footballer who plays as a center-back for Iraqi side Al-Diwaniya.

References

1993 births
Living people
Liberian footballers
Liberia international footballers
LISCR FC players
Red Lions FC (Liberia) players
Barrack Young Controllers FC players
FC Fassell players
LPRC Oilers players
Association football defenders
Place of birth missing (living people)